Christian Neumann Weiler (born May 1, 1979) is an American tax lawyer from Louisiana who serves as a judge of the United States Tax Court.

Early life and education 

Weiler was born in New Orleans and raised in Bourg, Louisiana. He earned his Bachelor of Science from Louisiana State University, his Juris Doctor from the Loyola University New Orleans College of Law, and his Master of Laws in Taxation from the Dedman School of Law at Southern Methodist University.

Career 

Before becoming a judge, Weiler was a partner at Weiler & Rees in New Orleans, Louisiana, where his practice included all areas of tax law, with an emphasis on tax litigation. Weiler was a board-certified tax law specialist as recognized by the Louisiana Board of Legal Specialization. He also served as an officer with the Tax Section of the Louisiana State Bar Association.

United States Tax Court service 

On November 6, 2019, President Donald Trump announced his intent to nominate Weiler to serve as a judge of the United States Tax Court for a term of fifteen years. On November 19, 2019, his nomination was sent to the Senate. President Trump nominated Weiler to the seat vacated by Judge Albert G. Lauber, who took senior status on January 1, 2020. On August 13, 2020, the United States Senate confirmed his nomination by voice vote. He was sworn into office on September 9, 2020.

References

External links 

1979 births
Living people
21st-century American lawyers
21st-century American judges
Dedman School of Law alumni
Judges of the United States Tax Court
Lawyers from New Orleans
Louisiana lawyers
Louisiana State University alumni
Loyola University New Orleans College of Law alumni
United States Article I federal judges appointed by Donald Trump
Tax lawyers